Shui Junyi (born 20 September 1963 in Sanjia Jishuijia Village, Gansu), is a Chinese Han journalist.

His grandfather named Shui Zi, is a Lanzhou in Gansu Province.

Early life
From 1980 to 1984, he studied English Language and Literature at the Department of Foreign Languages, Lanzhou University. Shui Yishi graduated from the Communication University of China in 2006.

Career 
From 1984 to 1993, he worked as an editor and reporter at the International Newsroom of Xinhua News Agency. From 1989 to 1991, he was a correspondent working in Egypt and participated in Gulf War reporting. Xinhua was one of the Chinese domestic mainstream media that reported on.

In 1993, he joined China Central Television and participated in the Oriental Horizon program and was the host of the news commentary Focus Report.

On 5 February 2003 five people including Shui went to Iraq to report. On March 18, two days before the war began, Shui reported that the group had withdrawn from Baghdad. On March 26, some members of the report group returned for further report.

In 2003, he was named as one of China's top ten outstanding young people.

Shui became the presenter of the news programme The World of China Central Television.

Personal life
Shui's original wife is Wang Jun() with whom he fathered had a daughter, Shui Yishi. Shui's current wife is Yang Di, and they have two children.

References

1963 births
Living people
CCTV television presenters
People from Lanzhou